Roseaux; also City of Roseaux, Roseaux City is the principal town of the Roseaux commune of the Corail Arrondissement, in the Grand'Anse department of Haiti.

It is listed as a location in the book The Geographical and Historical Dictionary of America and the West.

References

Populated places in Grand'Anse (department)